Anna and the King of Siam may refer to:

Anna and the King of Siam (novel), a 1944 novel by Margaret Landon
Anna and the King of Siam (film), a 1946 film starring Irene Dunne and Rex Harrison
Anna and the King (TV series), a 1972 American sitcom
Anna and the King, a 1999 film starring Jodie Foster and Chow Yun-Fat

See also
The King and I (disambiguation)